The Gouge flap, invented by Arthur Gouge of Short Brothers in 1936, allowed the pilot to increase both the wing area and the chord of an aircraft's wing, thereby reducing the stalling speed at a given weight. This provided the benefit of a shorter takeoff distance for a given load, a shorter distance to achieve a given height and a lower takeoff speed. This type of flap, in spite of its use on successful aircraft such as the Short Sunderland and the Short Stirling, was limited to use on aircraft produced by Short Brothers.



Development

The Gouge flap was patented in 1936, British Patent no. 443,516 being awarded jointly to Short Bros. Ltd. and Arthur Gouge for "Improvements in or connected with Wings for Aircraft, (controller flaps)".

The Gouge flap "consists of a sharp nosed aerofoil, which in the closed position, forms part of the wing profile . The flap tapers with the wing, i.e. the width of the flap at any point is a constant proportion of the wing chord at that point; when open the extended portion also varies with the chord. All sections through the flapped 
portion of the wing are similar in shape and proportion. The flap moves on tracks, rotating conically about an imaginary axis below the wing, nearly parallel to the trailing edge. When open, the flap increases the wing chord and the wing area."

Excellent photographs of the fully extended flap, taken from obliquely above and below the wing, are given in the British Aeronautical Research Committee's research paper R&M No. 1753. 
Among the conclusions of that report were that "flap half and fully open decreases the distance from rest to take-off by 14 per cent. and 23 per cent., and also decreases the distance from take-off to clear a 50 ft. obstacle by 21 per cent. and 23 per cent. respectively. The speed at take-off is reduced by 3 and 8 m.p.h, respectively."

History
Short Brothers first installed the Gouge flap on a Scion fitted with the (scaled-down) wings being prepared for the Short Empire flying-boat.  The flaps on this aircraft, which was designated 'M.3', were submitted to extensive testing by the Royal Aircraft Establishment Farnborough, their report appearing as R&M No. 1753 (see Bibliography below). Shorts used the Gouge flaps on several successful aircraft types, e.g. the Empire  boats, the Short S.26 G-class 'Golden Boats', the Short Sunderland and the Stirling.

When Flight Magazine described the Fowler flap in 1942, the article's subtitle read "An American High-lift Device With Properties Similar to Those of the Better-known British Types", and the Gouge, Handley Page, and Fairey/Youngman flaps were all given equal mention. The Gouge flap, although widely used on Shorts aircraft, was not adopted by other manufacturers, several of which developed their own variants. The Aeronautical Research Council's R&M no. 2622 entitled "The Aerodynamic Characteristics of Flaps" dated 1947 compared many variants but merely mentions the Gouge flap in a footnote on p. 10, where it is described as being "rather like the Blackburn flap ... but with no slot between the flap and wing."

The advantage of the additional lift generated by a slot acted in the Fowler flap's success relative to the Gouge flap, as did its natural tendency to retract itself in flight.

Shorts themselves did not use the Gouge flap on their next project, the Shetland, preferring the use of slotted flaps on this large seaplane.

See also
Aerodynamics
Airfoil
Lift (force)
Flap (aircraft)
High-lift device

References

Notes

Bibliography

Aircraft controls